Delaware's 6th Senate district is one of 21 districts in the Delaware Senate. It has been represented by Democrat Russ Huxtable since 2023, succeeding Republican Ernesto López.

Geography
District 6 is based in the Cape Region in coastal Sussex County, covering Rehoboth Beach, Lewes, Milton, and the surrounding communities.

Like all districts in the state, the 6th Senate district is located entirely within Delaware's at-large congressional district. It overlaps with the 14th, 20th, and 36th districts of the Delaware House of Representatives.

Recent election results
Delaware Senators are elected to staggered four-year terms. Under normal circumstances, the 6th district holds elections in midterm years, except immediately after redistricting, when all seats are up for election regardless of usual cycle.

2018

2014

2012

Federal and statewide results in District 6

References 

6
Sussex County, Delaware